Manfred Krug (8 February 1937 – 21 October 2016) was a German actor, singer and author.

Life and work
Born in Duisburg, Krug moved to East Germany at the age of 13, and worked at a steel plant before beginning his acting career on the stage and, ultimately, in film. By the end of the 1950s he had several film roles, and in 1960 he appeared in Frank Beyer's successful war movie Fünf Patronenhülsen (Five Cartridges). Many more film roles followed, with Krug often cast as a socialist hero. Krug also achieved notability as a popular jazz singer, often in collaboration with composer Günther Fischer.

In 1976 the East German government (GDR) forbade Krug to work as an actor and singer because he participated in protests against the expulsion and stripping of GDR citizenship of Wolf Biermann. On 20 April 1977 he requested to leave the GDR and as soon as he got the approval he left the GDR and moved to Schöneberg in West Berlin. After moving back to West Germany he very soon got new roles as an actor but very rarely sang in public for a long time. In 1978 Krug appeared as one of the male leads of the action-drama television series Auf Achse, and would continue to appear on the series until 1995, one year before the show ended its long run. Krug's various television roles even included a two-year stint on the children's program Sesamstraße, the German version of the American children's program Sesame Street. In the 1980s and 1990s, he also starred as Hauptkommissar Paul Stoever in the Tatort series of TV crime movies, which would eventually run for forty installments in total. He died on 21 October 2016 in Berlin.

Filmography

Film

 1957: Ein Mädchen von 16½
 1959: Goods for Catalonia
 1959: Der Freischütz
 1959: Reportage 57
 1959: Before the Lightning Strikes (cameo)
 1960: Was wäre, wenn...?
 1960: 
 1960: Five Cartridges
 1961: Professor Mamlock
 1961: Guten Tag, lieber Tag
 1961: Urfaust
 1961: Bei Anruf Mord
 1961: Drei Kapitel Glück
 1961: On the Sunny Side
 1962: Midnight Revue
 1962: 
 1962: Star-Crossed Lovers
 1962: 
 1962: The Boxer and Death
 1963: 
 1963: Beschreibung eines Sommers
 1964: Follow Me, Scoundrels 
 1965: 
 1965: Die antike Münze
 1966: Trace of Stones (released: 1990)
 1967: Frau Venus und ihr Teufel
 1967: The Banner of Krivoi Rog
 1968: Hauptmann Florian von der Mühle
 1968: 
 1969: Weite Straßen – stille Liebe
 1969: Käuzchenkuhle
 1969: 
 1970: Netzwerk
 1970: 
 1970: 
 1971: Husaren in Berlin
 1971: Die Verschworenen
 1972: Ukradená bitva
 1973: 
 1974: 
 1976: Daniel Druskat
 1977: 
 1977:  (released: 1979)
 1978: 
 1987: Whopper Punch 777
 1990: 
 1990: 
 1994: The Blue One

Television
 1968: Ways across the Country (TV miniseries)
 1973: Stülpner-Legende (TV miniseries)
 1978: Paul kommt zurück
 1979: Phantasten
 1980–1993: Auf Achse (TV series, 73 episodes)
 1980: Ein Mann fürs Leben
 1981: Flächenbrand
 1981–1983: Das Traumschiff (TV series, 2 episodes)
 1982:  (TV series, 14 episodes)
 1982–1988: Die Krimistunde (TV series, 2 episodes)
 1982: Väter (anthology film)
 1982–1984: Sesamstraße (TV series, 292 episodes)
 1983: Rendevous der Damen (anthology film)
 1983: Wer raucht die Letzte?
 1983: Konsul Möllers Erben (TV miniseries)
 1983: Jakob und Adele (TV series, 1 episode)
 1983: Geschichten aus der Heimat (TV series, 1 episode)
 1984: Joseph Süß Oppenheimer
 1984–2001: Tatort (TV series, 41 episodes)
 1984: Krumme Touren (anthology film)
 1985: Ein Heim für Tiere: Caesar (TV series episode)
 1986–1998: Liebling Kreuzberg (TV series, 58 episodes)
 1986–1987: Detektivbüro Roth (TV series, 34 episodes)
 1994–1995: Wir sind auch nur ein Volk (TV miniseries)

Film about Manfred Krug
 1998: Abgehauen (TV film), with Peter Lohmeyer as Manfred Krug

Discography
 1962: Auf der Sonnenseite
 1964: Jazz und Lyrik
 1965: Manfred Krug und die Modern Jazz Big Band
 1966: Lyrik - Jazz - Prosa (with Eberhard Esche, Annekathrin Bürger and others, in different editions and under different names, some of them in censored versions without Manfred Krug)
 1969: Onkel Toms Hütte (audiobook, Krug singing to spirituals)
 1970: Fredmanns Episteln an diese und jene aber hauptsächlich an Ulla Winblad (after Carl Michael Bellman)
 1971: Das war nur ein Moment
 1973: Ein Hauch von Frühling
 1974: Greens
 1976: Du bist heute wie neu
 1977: Abgehauen
 1979: Da bist Du ja
 1997: Anthologie
 2000: Tatort – die Songs (with Charles Brauer)
 2000: Evergreens - Das Beste von Manfred Krug - 1962–1977
 2000: Deutsche Schlager
 2000: Schlafstörung
 2001: Manfred Krug Live mit Fanny (with Fanny Krug)
 2002: Leben bis Männer (Audiobook; from Thomas Brussig)
 2002: Der Weihnachtskrug
 2003: Sweet Nothings (with Decebal Badila and Fanny Krug)
 2005: Geschichten Vom Herrn K. (Audiobook; from Bertolt Brecht)
 2005: Lust des Beginnens (Audiobook; from Bertolt Brecht)
 2005: Neuigkeiten an Manfred Krug und Otti (Audiobook; from Jurek Becker)

Literature
 Abgehauen (1997) 
 Mein schönes Leben (2003)

Awards
1962 Heinrich-Greif-Preis First Class for On the Sunny Side, ensemble award
1963 Erich-Weinert-Medaille for Beschreibung eines Sommers with Christel Bodenstein
1965 Erich-Weinert-Medaille for The Adventures of Werner Holt, ensemble award
1968 National Prize of East Germany First Class for Ways across the Country, ensemble award
1971 National Prize of East Germany Second Class
1972 "Ehrende Anerkennung" (Special Award) at Workers' Filmfestival of Czechoslovakia for Ukradená bitva
1973 Verdienstmedaille der DDR
1979 Goldene Europa of Europawelle Saar
1984 Goldener Bambi
1990 Bayerischer Fernsehpreis for TV series Liebling Kreuzberg (SFB/NDR/WDR), together with Jurek Becker and Werner Masten
1990 Bavarian Film Awards, Best Actor
2006 Platin Romy lifetime award

External links

References

1937 births
2016 deaths
German male television actors
German male stage actors
German male film actors
20th-century German male actors
Recipients of the Heinrich Greif Prize
Ernst Busch Academy of Dramatic Arts alumni
Recipients of the Medal of Merit of the GDR